Eupithecia yathomi is a moth in the family Geometridae. It is found in Jordan.

The wingspan is about 13.5 mm.

References

Moths described in 1991
yathomi
Moths of Asia